Bialystok-Grodno District was an administrative division of German-controlled territory of Ober-Ost during World War I (after the Gorlice–Tarnów Offensive). It was bordered by the Lithuania District to the north.

History
The area was formed roughly by parts of the former Grodno Governorate of the Russian Empire.

References

Geographic history of Poland